The 1985 Miami Redskins football team was an American football team that represented Miami University in the Mid-American Conference (MAC) during the 1985 NCAA Division I-A football season. In its third season under head coach Tim Rose, the team compiled an 8–2–1 record (7–1–1 against MAC opponents), finished in second place in the MAC, and outscored all opponents by a combined total of 266 to 211.

The team's statistical leaders included Terry Morris with 1,471 passing yards, George Swarn with 1,511 rushing yards, and Tom Murphy with 430 receiving yards.

Schedule

References

Miami
Miami RedHawks football seasons
Miami Redskins football